A polyolefin is a type of polymer with the general formula (CH2CHR)n where R is an alkyl group. They are usually derived from a small set of simple olefins (alkenes). Dominant in a commercial sense are polyethylene and polypropylene. More specialized polyolefins include polyisobutylene and polymethylpentene. They are all colorless or white oils or solids. Many copolymers are known, such as polybutene, which derives from a mixture of different butene isomers. The name of each polyolefin indicates the olefin from which it is prepared; for example, polyethylene is derived from ethylene, and polymethylpentene is derived from 4-methyl-1-pentene.  Polyolefins are not olefins themselves because the double bond of each olefin monomer is opened in order to form the polymer. Monomers having more than one double bond such as butadiene and isoprene yield polymers that contain double bonds (polybutadiene and polyisoprene) and are usually not considered polyolefins. Polyolefins are the foundations of many chemical industries.

Industrial polyolefins
Most polyolefin are made by treating the monomer with metal-containing catalysts. The reaction is highly exothermic.

Traditionally, Ziegler-Natta catalysts are used.  Named after the Nobelists Karl Ziegler and Giulio Natta, these catalysts are prepared by treating titanium chlorides with organoaluminium compounds, such as triethylaluminium.  In some cases, the catalyst is insoluble and is used as a slurry.  In the case of polyethylene, chromium-containing Phillips catalysts are used often.  Kaminsky catalysts are yet another family of catalysts that are amenable to systematic changes to modify the tacticity of the polymer, especially applicable to polypropylene.

 Thermoplastic polyolefins
 low-density polyethylene (LDPE), 
 linear low-density polyethylene (LLDPE),
 very-low-density polyethylene (VLDPE),
 ultra-low-density polyethylene (ULDPE),
 medium-density polyethylene (MDPE),
 polypropylene (PP),
 polymethylpentene (PMP),
 polybutene-1 (PB-1);
 ethylene-octene copolymers,
 stereo-block PP,
 olefin block copolymers,
 propylene–butane copolymers;
 Polyolefin elastomers (POE)
 polyisobutylene (PIB),
 poly(a-olefin)s,
 ethylene propylene rubber (EPR),
 ethylene propylene diene monomer (M-class) rubber (EPDM rubber).

Properties
Polyolefin properties range from liquidlike to rigid solids, and are primarily determined by their molecular weight and degree of crystallinity. Polyolefin degrees of crystallinity range from 0% (liquidlike) to 60% or higher (rigid plastics). Crystallinity is primarily governed by the lengths of polymer's crystallizable sequences established during polymerization. Examples include adding a small percentage of comonomer like 1-hexene or 1-octene during the polymerization of ethylene, or occasional irregular insertions ("stereo" or "regio" defects) during the polymerization of isotactic propylene. The polymer's ability to crystallize to high degrees decreases with increasing content of defects.

Low degrees of crystallinity (0–20%) are associated with liquidlike-to-elastomeric properties. Intermediate degrees of crystallinity (20–50%) are associated with ductile thermoplastics, and degrees of crystallity over 50% are associated with rigid and sometimes brittle plastics.

Polyolefin surfaces are not effectively joined together by solvent welding because they have excellent chemical resistance and are unaffected by common solvents. They can be adhesively bonded after surface treatment (they inherently have very low surface energies and don't wet-out well (the process of being covered and filled with resin)), and by some superglues (cyanoacrylates) and reactive (meth)acrylate glues. They are extremely inert chemically but exhibit decreased strength at lower and higher temperatures. As a result of this, thermal welding is a common bonding technique.

Practically all polyolefins that are of any practical or commercial importance are poly-alpha-olefin (or poly-α-olefin or polyalphaolefin, sometimes abbreviated as PAO), a polymer made by polymerizing an alpha-olefin. An alpha-olefin (or α-olefin) is an alkene where the carbon-carbon double bond starts at the α-carbon atom, i.e. the double bond is between the #1 and #2 carbons in the molecule. Alpha-olefins such as 1-hexene may be used as co-monomers to give an alkyl branched polymer (see chemical structure below), although 1-decene is most commonly used for lubricant base stocks.

Many poly-alpha-olefins have flexible alkyl branching groups on every other carbon of their polymer backbone chain. These alkyl groups, which can shape themselves in numerous conformations, make it very difficult for the polymer molecules to align themselves up side-by-side in an orderly way. This results in lower contact surface area between the molecules and decreases the intermolecular interactions between molecules. Therefore, many poly-alpha-olefins do not crystallize or solidify easily and are able to remain oily, viscous liquids even at lower temperatures. Low molecular weight poly-alpha-olefins are useful as synthetic lubricants such as synthetic motor oils for vehicles and can be used over a wide temperature range.

Even polyethylenes copolymerized with a small amount of alpha-olefins (such as 1-hexene, 1-octene, or longer) are more flexible than simple straight-chain high-density polyethylene, which has no branching. The methyl branch groups on a polypropylene polymer are not long enough to make typical commercial polypropylene more flexible than polyethylene.

Uses 

 Polyethylene:
 HDPE: used for film (wrapping of goods), blow molding (e.g., liquid containers, bleach bottles), injection molding (e.g., toys, screw caps), extrusion coating (e.g., coating on milk cartons), piping for distributing water and gas, insulation for telephone cables. Wire and cable insulation.
 LDPE: mainly (70%) used for film.

 Polypropylene: injection molding, fibers, and film. Compared to polyethylene, polypropylene is stiffer but less prone to breaking. It is less dense but shows more chemical resistance.
 Synthetic base oil (by far the most used one): industrial and automotive lubricants.

References

External links

 MSDS (Material Safety Data Sheet)

 
Plastics